The 1985–86 Illinois State Redbirds men's basketball team represented Illinois State University during the 1985–86 NCAA Division I men's basketball season. The Redbirds, led by eighth year head coach Bob Donewald, played their home games at Horton Field House and competed as a member of the Missouri Valley Conference.

They finished the season 15–14, 9–7 in conference play to finish in fourth place. They were the number four seed for the Missouri Valley Conference tournament. They made it to the semifinal game before losing to ninth ranked Bradley University.

Roster

Schedule

|-
!colspan=9 style=|Exhibition Season

|-
!colspan=9 style=|Regular Season

|-
!colspan=9 style=|Missouri Valley Conference {MVC} tournament

References

Illinois State Redbirds men's basketball seasons
Illinois State